Oak Beach is a coastal town and locality in the Shire of Douglas, Queensland, Australia.

Geography
Oak Beach is bounded by the Coral Sea to east and completely surrounded by the locality of Mowbray on all its land boundaries.

The locality has the following beaches:
  Pebbly Beach in the northern part of the locality extending north into neighbouring Mowbray
  the eponymous Oak Beach in the southern part of the locality extending south into neighbouring Mowbray

The town of Oak Beach is located in the far south-east of the locality on the coast. The residential areas are along the coast in the town and along the coast on Pebbly Beach. The southern part of the locality is mostly rural residential. The west of the locality is used to grow sugarcane.

Offshore is Trinity Bay, part of the Coral Sea.

The Captain Cook Highway enters the locality from the south-east (Mowbray) and exits to the north (Mowbray). It does not pass through the town.

History 

Education 
There are no schools in Oak Beach. The nearest government primary school is Port Douglas State School in Port Douglas to the north-west. The nearest government secondary school is Mossman State High School in Mossman to the north-west.

References

External links 

 

Towns in Queensland
Shire of Douglas
Coastline of Queensland
Localities in Queensland